Evil Metal is an album released on Area Total in 1992 by Telectu featuring Elliott Sharp.

Track listing
Untitled -4:15 	
Untitled -5:15 	
Untitled -2:20 	
Untitled -6:00 	
Untitled -3:09 	
Untitled -8:09 	
Untitled -5:43 	
Untitled -3:52 	
Untitled -18:46 	
Untitled -5:08 	
Untitled (with Elliott Sharp)-5:24 	
Untitled (with Elliott Sharp)-5:20

Personnel
Jorge Lima Barreto: Workstations W30 and ML, breath controllers Casio e EWI 200, Synthetiser JD800, Wave Station Korg
Vitor Rua: Multimedia guitar, Stick, Yamaha Zylo, Yamaha Computer Electronics
Elliott Sharp: Doubleneck Guitarbass, Soprano Sax (tracks 10 and 11).

References

1992 albums
Telectu albums